Jega may refer to:

 Jega (musician), Manchester, UK-based electronic music artist Dylan Nathan
 Jega, Nigeria, a Local Government Area in Kebbi State
 Japanese Enhanced Graphics Adapter, an enhanced EGA display adapter for Japanese AX architecture computers
 Attahiru Jega, 4th Chairman of the Independent National Electoral Commission of Nigeria, serving from 2010 to 2015
 Jega 'Rdomnai, an alien assassin and major antagonist in the video game Halo Infinite.

See also 
 Gega (disambiguation)